Prem Bandhan may refer to:
 Prem Bandhan (1979 film), an Indian Hindi-language romantic drama film
 Prem Bandhan (1941 film), an Indian Tamil-language romantic drama film
 Prem Bandhan (TV series), a 2020 Indian dramatic television series